Pâtisserie E. Ladurée, commonly known as Ladurée, is a French manufacturer and retailer of high-end pastries and candy, which was established in 1862. It is one of the world's best-known sellers of the double-decker macaron, 15,000 of which are sold every day. The company is a société par actions simplifiée (simplified joint stock corporation) and has its head office in Paris, France.

Early years
Louis Ernest Ladurée, a miller, founded a bakery in 1862 on the rue Royale, Paris. During the Paris Commune uprising of 1871, the bakery was burnt down. A pastry shop was built at the same location, and Jules Chéret was entrusted with the interior decoration. The chubby cherubs dressed as pastry cooks, painted by him on the ceiling, form the company's emblem. The interior of the premises were painted in the same celadon colour as the façade.

Ladurée's rise to fame came in 1930 when his little cousin, Pierre Desfontaines, had the original idea of the double-decker, sticking two macaron shells together with a creamy ganache as filling. Queen Catherine de' Medici had brought the macaron to France from Italy in the 16th century, and the recipe for the biscuit had hardly varied over the years, but the amounts of the ingredients used and the appearance of the end product were up to the individual bakers.

French pastry chef Pierre Hermé helped orchestrate the expansion of Ladurée: "In one year Ladurée went from a little bakery in the eighth district of Paris to a big brand name. When I arrived, there was not a lot of organization. I really brought the savoir-faire to the company. When I arrived, they didn't have a logo."

Recent history
In 1993, Groupe Holder took over Ladurée. The Holder family also owns the PAUL bakery chain in France. Following the takeover, the company began an expansion drive to turn Ladurée from the single rue Royale bakery into a chain, setting up pastry shops and tea rooms on the Champs-Élysées and in Le Printemps Haussmann in 1997, followed by Ladurée Bonaparte in 2002.

The international development of Ladurée started in 2005 with London, in the Harrods department store. In 1997, two shops opened in Paris – the first on the Champs-Élysées, next to its tea room, decorated by Jacques Garcia, and the second in the rue Bonaparte, decorated by Roxane Rodriguez. A shop opened in 2006 in London, also decorated by Roxane Rodriguez. The takeaway models of the rue Bonaparte and Harrods stores were exported to their other locations.

Ladurée stores are now also present in Canada, Belgium, India, Ireland, Japan, Kuwait, Luxembourg, Monaco, Qatar, Saudi Arabia, Switzerland, the United Arab Emirates, the United Kingdom, and the United States.

In 2012, Ladurée released a makeup collection inspired by the colours of their macarons. It became available in Japan in February 2012, and in Europe from November 2012.

In February 2014, Marie-Hélène de Taillac, a jewelry designer, collaborated with Ladurée to create sets of fashion macaron. The box containing the macarons depicts de Taillac's "Rainbow" necklace, featuring gold sequins and the piece's multicolored briolette gemstone. Ladurée had Marie-Hélène de Taillac-inspired window installations in its Tokyo, Paris, and New York City stores.

In 2019, Ladurée switched to a vegan-only menu at their Beverly Hills location.

In popular culture
Ladurée made the pastries for the film Marie Antoinette, directed by Sofia Coppola; its famous macarons can be seen in a scene between Marie Antoinette and Ambassador Mercy.

They can also be seen in The CW's hit teen drama Gossip Girl as Blair Waldorf's favorite pastries.

Ladurée regularly collaborate with fashion designers: in 2009 with Christian Louboutin, then the same year with Marni.

In 2011, Ladurée was chosen to conceive macarons for Albert II, Prince of Monaco and Charlene Wittstock's wedding.

Controversy 

The Court of Appeal in Paris granted "moral" copyright (the right to be credited) to the creator of certain Ladurée stores' elaborate interior design. This came about as a consequence when Ladurée reproduced photographs of the premises in a book. By final judgment of March 3, 2017. The Paris Court of Appeal, ruling contradictorily (extract). Confirm the judgment rendered on January 29, 2016 between the parties by the Paris Supreme Court. By judgment contradictory and delivered in first instance on January 29, the Paris Supreme Court (extract) says that the decorations of the lounge in the first floor of the pastry Ladurée Bonaparte, in Paris, of the black lounge and the lounge Opéra for the pastry Ladurée Harrods in London, of the Lounge Marie-Antoinette of the tearoom Ladurée Ginza in Tokyo are protected by copyright, said that Madam Rodriguez is the author of these decorations (extracts), condamne PASTRIES E.LADUREE COMPANIES and HACHETTE BOOK and Mister Serge GLEIZES in solidum to pay 15 000 Euros sum to Madam Roxane RODRIGUEZ for the damage resulting of violations on the right morale of author. Publication on newspaper "Le Monde" on June, 28th, 2018 The newspaper "Challenges" wrote an article on November, 13th, 2017 : " Ladurée poursuivi en justice par son ancienne décoratrice" by David Bensoussan.

Locations
Apart from ten stores in Paris and one in Versailles Ladurée operates stores in the following airports and cities, as of july 2022:

Europe
Cannes, France (1)
Charles de Gaulle Airport, Paris, France (3)
Dublin, Ireland (1)
Geneva, Switzerland (4)
Lausanne, Switzerland (2)
London, England (5)
Luxembourg, Luxembourg (1)
Megève, France (1)
Monaco (1)
Nice, France (4)
Paris, France (10)
Orly Airport (4)
Versailles, France (1)

Asia

Dubai, UAE (4)
Abu Dhabi, UAE (2)
 Sharjah, UAE (1)
 Shanghai, China (1)
Al-Zahraa, Kuwait (1)
New Delhi, India (1)
Kyoto, Japan (1)
Tokyo, Japan (5)
Yokohama, Japan (1)
Doha, Qatar (2)
Almaty, Kazakhstan (1)

North and South America

United States
Glendale, CA (1)
Beverly Hills, CA (1)
New York City, NY (3)
Miami, FL (2)
Washington, DC (1)
Bethesda, Maryland (1) 

Canada
Toronto, ON 
Vancouver, BC

References

External links

 

1862 establishments in France
Bakeries of France
Food and drink companies established in 1862
French brands
Privately held companies of France
Shops in Paris